The Kuwait Davis Cup team represents Kuwait in Davis Cup tennis competition and are governed by the Kuwait Tennis Federation.

Kuwait currently compete in the Asia/Oceania Zone of Group III.  They have reached the Group II semifinals twice.

History
Kuwait competed in its first Davis Cup in 1989.

Current team (2022) 

TBD

See also
Davis Cup

External links

Davis Cup teams
Davis Cup
Davis Cup